Tammy Di Calafiori (born March 10, 1989) is a Brazilian actress and television host. She has played the lead role in the telenovela Ciranda de Pedra.

Career 
Born in Rio de Janeiro, her first work was in the 2005 telenovela Alma Gêmea, by Walcyr Carrasco, playing Nina, sister of Vitório, played by Malvino Salvador. Tammy Di Calafiori played one of the lead roles, Vírginia Prado, daughter of Ana Paula Arósio's character, named Laura Prado, in the 2008 Rede Globo telenovela Ciranda de Pedra, playing the same character as Lucélia Santos in the 1980s version of the telenovela.

Telenovela author Sílvio de Abreu invited her to join the cast of the 2010 telenovela Passione, when she played a patricinha (Brazilian version of valley girl) character named Lorena Gouveia, daughter of Stella Gouveia, played by Maitê Proença Both characters get involved in a love triangle with Daniel de Oliveira's character, named Agnello Mattoli.

Tammy Di Calafiori was announced in 2012 as one of the hosts of the Brazilian version of the American sports channel Fox Sports, thus making her debut has a reporter and as a sports host.

Filmography

Television

Cinema

Theater

References

External links 
 

1989 births
Living people
Actresses from Rio de Janeiro (city)
Brazilian people of Italian descent
Brazilian film actresses
Brazilian telenovela actresses